ᾏ
Karand (also Romanized as Kārand and Kārend; also known as Kāranj, Kārenj, and Kāvand) is a village in Bahmai-ye Garmsiri-ye Jonubi Rural District, in the Central District of Bahmai County, Kohgiluyeh and Boyer-Ahmad Province, Iran. At the 2006 census, its population was 66, in 13 families.

References 

Populated places in Bahmai County